Mary-Russell Ferrell Colton (March 25, 1889 – July 26, 1971) was an American artist, author, educator, ethnographer, and curator. She is one of the principal founders of the Museum of Northern Arizona. She was a member of the Philadelphia Ten, exhibiting at the group's annual shows from 1926 to 1940. She was also a member of the National Association of Women Painters and Sculptors, the American Watercolor Society, and the American Federation of Arts. She is known for her advocacy of the arts, Native American rights, and women's rights. For her advocacy of Native American arts, she received a certificate of appreciation from the United States Department of the Interior, Indian Arts and Crafts Board in 1935. In 1982, she was inducted into the Arizona Women's Hall of Fame.

Personal background
Mary-Russell Ferrell was born on March 25, 1889, in Louisville, Kentucky. She is the daughter of Joseph and Elise (née Houston) Ferrell. Her father was known as one of the first Anglo-Americans to explore the Tenaya Canyon in what is now Yosemite National Park. After he died in 1904, Elise Ferrell remarried businessman Theodore Presser.

In 1904 at age 15, Mary-Russell Ferrell enrolled at the Philadelphia School of Design for Women, graduating in 1909 with honors. After her graduation, she opened a studio in Philadelphia. Her projects included art restoration and commercial art projects. In addition to the commercial art her studio produced, Mary-Russell Ferrell showed as a member of the Philadelphia Ten's annual exhibit in Florida, the Midwest, the Eastern States of the US and Europe.

On May 23, 1912, Mary-Russell Ferrell married Harold Sellers Colton, a zoology professor at the University of Pennsylvania. They had two sons, Ferrell, born in 1914, and Sabin born in 1917. Sabin died of valley fever in Tucson in 1924. Their marriage lasted until her death.

Professional background
In April 1926, the Coltons moved to Flagstaff, Arizona. During this time, she painted in and around the Colorado Plateau. She also established the Museum of Northern Arizona. Through her writing, painting and work as an advocate of Native American peoples and Native American arts, she made contributions to progressive education, the Indian arts and crafts movement and archeology.

Colton served as the curator of art for the Museum of Northern Arizona for 20 years. She also recorded the history of the Colorado Plateau through her paintings and her MNA exhibits. She wrote 21 articles and two books. As an artist and the curator of art at the museum, Colton often worked with Native American artists to bring recognition and acceptance of their work into the international art community.

Throughout her career as an artist, Colton painted a variety of subjects including landscapes, figures, still life and genre scenes. She is known for her sensitive portraits utilizing vibrant, unusual color values. The Christian Science Monitor of September 2, 1920, printed a copy of her painting, Sunset on a Lava Field. The author wrote; "In her Arizona canvases, Mrs. Colton gives full sway to her love of color. One is impressed by the sense of vast remoteness that she manages to capture for these western paintings that are bringing her increasing recognition."

Prominent works include
 Church at Ranchos de Taos (c. 1913)
 Edmund Nequatewa (c. 1942)
 Walpi (c. 1914)
 Navajo Shepardess (c. 1916)
 Sunset and Moonglow (c. 1917)
 Lonesome Hole (c. 1929)
 Sedona From Red Ledge (c. 1952)
 Sunset on a Lava Field (c. 1919)

Exhibitions

Mary-Russell Ferrell Colton: Artist and Advocate in Early Arizona. Museum of Northern Arizona, June 17-October 28, 2012; Desert Caballeros Western Museum, Wickenburg, Arizona, December 14, 2012, to March 3, 2013.

Published works
 Colton, Mary-Russell Ferrell. Hopi Dyes, Flagstaff: Museum of Northern Arizona, 1965.
 Colton, Mary-Russell Ferrell and Harold Sellers. "Petroglyphs, the record of a great adventure", Washington D.C. American Anthropologist, 1931.
 Colton, Mary-Russell Ferrell; Nonabah Gorman Bryan; Stella Young. Navajo and Hopi Dyes, Salt Lake City, Utah: Historic Indian Publishers, 1965. 
 Colton, Mary-Russell Ferrell. Art for the schools of the Southwest, an outline for the public and Indian schools, Museum Bulletin, No. 6, Flagstaff, Arizona, Northern Arizona Society of Science and Art, 1934.
 Colton, Mary-Russell Ferrell and Edmund Nequatewa. Truth of a Hopi and other clan stories of Shung-Opovi, Museum of Northern Arizona. No. 8, Flagstaff, Arizona, Northern Arizona Society of Science and Art, 1947.
 Colton, Mary-Russell Ferrell. "Hopi silversmithing, its background and future", Plateau, Vol. 12, No. 1, Flagstaff, Arizona, Northern Arizona Society of Science and Art, 1939.
 Colton, Mary-Russell Ferrell. "Letter to the Editor", Coconino Sun, August 12, 1927.
 Colton, Mary-Russell Ferrell, and Harold Sellers. The Little Known Small House Ruins in the Coconino Forest, Memoirs of the American Anthropological Association Vol. 5. Lancaster, Pennsylvania, American Anthropological Association, 1918.
 Colton, Mary-Russell Ferrell. "Technique of Major Hopi Crafts", Museum Notes. Vol. 3, No 12. Flagstaff, Arizona, Museum of Northern Arizona, 1931.

References

External links

 History of Philadelphia Ten
 Arizona Women's Hall of Fame:Arizona State Library
 Arizona Women's Heritage Trail 
 "Mary and Harold Colton, Founders of the Museum of Northern Arizona", KBAQ:Hearing the Century

1889 births
1971 deaths
American ethnographers
20th-century American historians
American conservationists
American women environmentalists
20th-century American zoologists
20th-century American painters
American women painters
American watercolorists
Modern painters
Painters from Kentucky
Artists from Louisville, Kentucky
Writers from Louisville, Kentucky
Painters from Arizona
Writers from Arizona
American women anthropologists
American women historians
20th-century American women artists
20th-century American women scientists
Women watercolorists
20th-century American women writers
Kentucky women artists
Philadelphia School of Design for Women alumni
20th-century American philanthropists